Brian Allen (born October 21, 1993) is an American football cornerback for the Birmingham Stallions of the United States Football League (USFL). He played college football at Utah. He was drafted by the Pittsburgh Steelers of the National Football League (NFL) in the fifth round (173rd overall) of the 2017 NFL Draft, and has also spent time with the Seattle Seahawks, Buffalo Bills, San Francisco 49ers, Cincinnati Bengals, and Cleveland Browns.

Professional career
Coming out of Utah, the majority of NFL draft experts and scouts projected Allen to be selected in the fifth or sixth round. He received an invitation to the NFL Combine and completed all of the required combine and positional drills. On March 23, 2017, he participated at Utah's pro day and chose to redo the vertical jump, broad jump, and twenty yard shuttle while also doing positional drills. He increased his vertical to 38 inches and was able to decrease his shuttle time. Team representatives and scouts from all 32 NFL teams were in attendance to scout Allen, Garett Bolles, Isaac Asiata, and 20 other prospects.

Pittsburgh Steelers
The Pittsburgh Steelers selected Allen in the fifth round with the 173rd overall pick in the 2017 NFL Draft.

On May 8, 2017, the Pittsburgh Steelers signed Allen to a four-year, $2.63 million contract with a signing bonus of $230,179.

He entered his first training camp competing with William Gay, Mike Hilton, Greg Ducre, Brandon Dixon, and Senquez Golson for a job to be a backup cornerback. Allen was named the Steelers' fifth cornerback on their depth chart to begin the regular season, behind Artie Burns, Coty Sensabaugh, Mike Hilton, and William Gay.

On September 17, 2017, Allen made his professional regular season debut during the Steelers' 26–9 victory over the Minnesota Vikings.

On September 1, 2018, Allen was waived by the Steelers and was signed to the practice squad the next day. He was promoted to the active roster on October 2, 2018.

On August 27, 2019, Allen was placed on injured reserve. He was waived with an injury settlement on August 31, 2019.

Seattle Seahawks
On October 15, 2019, Allen was signed to the Seattle Seahawks practice squad. He signed a reserve/future contract with the Seahawks on January 14, 2020. He was waived on August 10, 2020.

Buffalo Bills 
Allen signed with the Buffalo Bills on August 28, 2020. He was waived on September 5 as a part of final cuts.

San Francisco 49ers
On September 16, 2020, Allen was signed to the San Francisco 49ers practice squad. He was elevated to the active roster for the team's week 5 game against the Miami Dolphins, and reverted to the practice squad after the game. He was released on October 27.

Cincinnati Bengals
On November 3, 2020, Allen was signed to the Cincinnati Bengals practice squad. He was placed on the practice squad/COVID-19 list by the team on November 11, and restored to the practice squad five days later. He was placed back on the practice squad/COVID-19 list on December 21, 2020, and restored to the practice squad again on January 1, 2021.

Cleveland Browns
Allen was signed to the Cleveland Browns' active roster off the Bengals' practice squad on January 4, 2021. He re-signed with the Browns after the season on March 29, 2021. The Browns terminated Allen's contract on August 31, 2021. He was re-signed to the practice squad on December 16. He was elevated to the active roster for the December 20 game versus the Oakland Raiders.

Birmingham Stallions
Allen was selected in the eighth round of the 2022 USFL Draft by the Birmingham Stallions.

New Orleans Saints
On August 11, 2022, Allen signed with the New Orleans Saints. He was waived on August 28.

Birmingham Stallions (second stint)
Allen re-signed with the Birmingham Stallions on January 24, 2023.

References

External links

San Francisco 49ers bio
Utah Utes bio

1993 births
Living people
American football cornerbacks
Birmingham Stallions (2022) players
Buffalo Bills players
Cincinnati Bengals players
Cleveland Browns players
New Orleans Saints players
People from La Marque, Texas
Pittsburgh Steelers players
Players of American football from Texas
San Francisco 49ers players
Seattle Seahawks players
Sportspeople from the Houston metropolitan area
Utah Utes football players